The list of ship launches in 1964 includes a chronological list of all ships launched in 1964.


References

Sources

1964
Ship launches